This is a list of members of the Parliament of Tuvalu or Palamene o Tuvalu who were elected at the 2010 Tuvaluan general election or as the result of by-elections during the life of the parliament.

References

Tuvalu politics-related lists